Peter Dijkstra (born 11 June 1978) is a Dutch conductor, especially of choirs and vocal ensembles.

Born in Roden, Drenthe, Dijkstra sang in his youth in Jongenskoor Roder, a boys' choir, which his father, Bouwe Dijkstra, founded in 1985. He sang the Cantatas of J. S. Bach with the likes of Gustav Leonhardt, Sigiswald Kuijken and Max van Egmond in Amsterdam. Later he studied singing and conducting at the Royal Conservatory of The Hague, at the Hochschule für Musik und Tanz Köln with Marcus Creed, and at the Royal College of Music in Stockholm with Jorma Panula. He also attended master classes with Eric Ericson and Tõnu Kaljuste. He led the ensemble The Gents.

In 2007 he was appointed chief conductor of the Swedish Radio Choir. He has collaborated with major European vocal ensembles and appeared as an orchestral conductor.

Awards 
 Kersjes-van-de-Groenekan-Preis (2002)
 Eric Ericson Award (2003)
 Grammy Award with Chor des Bayerischen Rundfunks (2008)
 Eugen-Jochum-Preis (2014)

References

External links 
 
 
 Peter Dijkstra BR Chor 2 October 2012
 Peter Dijkstra Bach-Cantatas

Dutch conductors (music)
Male conductors (music)
1978 births
Living people
People from Drenthe
Royal Conservatory of The Hague alumni
Hochschule für Musik und Tanz Köln alumni
Royal College of Music, Stockholm alumni
Dutch expatriates in Sweden
Dutch expatriates in Germany
21st-century conductors (music)
21st-century male musicians